Judaica Press is an Orthodox Jewish publishing house founded in New York City in 1963 by S. Goldman, and then taken over by his son Jack Goldman in response to the growing demand for books of scholarship in the English-speaking Jewish world. In addition to undertaking the now ubiquitous Judaica Press Mikraoth Gedoloth Nach (Prophets and Writings of the Tanakh-Hebrew Bible) series, Goldman immediately went about acquiring the rights to some of the major works of Jewish scholarship at the time: The Blackman Mishnayoth set, the Hirsch Humash set, and the Jastrow Dictionary of Talmudic Aramaic words.

External links
 The Judaica Press Tanach with Rashi at Chabad.org
 Judaica Press Company Website

Book publishing companies based in New York (state)
Jewish printing and publishing
Orthodox Judaism in New York City
Publishing companies established in 1963